Chapmanville may refer to:

Chapmanville, a village in Plum Township in Venango County, Pennsylvania
Chapmanville, West Virginia
Chapmanville is a historic place name for Chapmantown, a neighborhood in Chico, California